Peter Schuyler Bruff (23 July 1812 – 24 February 1900) was an English civil engineer 
remembered primarily for his part in establishing the East Anglian railway networks between the 1840s and 1860s. His contribution to the region's infrastructure and development extended far beyond the railways, however, and included the renovation of the Colchester water supply (1851-1880) and the Ipswich sewerage system (completed 1881), the development of the town of Harwich and the Essex resorts of Walton-on-the-Naze and Clacton on Sea (which he built up from an empty piece of farmland into a flourishing seaside town), and (not least) the late Victorian revival of the Coalport porcelain factory in Shropshire, which he purchased in 1880.

Early career
Bruff was born in Plymouth Dock. He published his Treatise on Engineering Field-Work, Containing Practical Land-Surveying for Railways, &c. in 1838, with an enlarged edition in 1840 and a second part in 1842. He was elected an Associate of the Institution of Civil Engineers on 19 May 1840.
 

Bruff worked on the Eastern Counties Railway from Shoreditch to Colchester, which was constructed between 1837 and 1843, but was discharged from the Company in 1842 owing to disagreements with the chief engineer John Braithwaite. Braithwaite's proposals for the line from Colchester to Ipswich involved very costly earthworks and construction. Bruff saw the opportunity for a more competitive and achievable project, and with the support of John Chevallier Cobbold of Ipswich, a director of the ECR, this was constructed between October 1844 and May 1846 with Joseph Locke as consulting engineer and Bruff as resident engineer, in the company name of the Eastern Union Railway.

So the railway arrived in Ipswich; the line was carried through the 361 yd (330 m) Stoke Tunnel in 1846 in the continuation of the line towards Bury St Edmunds, but the Ipswich railway station, which was originally sited at the other end of the tunnel, was relocated to its present site in 1860. At the same time, between August 1845 and the end of 1846, the line to Bury was constructed in the company name of the Ipswich and Bury Railway Company.

Between 1847 and 1849 Bruff engineered the Chappel Viaduct, which carries the Sudbury Branch Line across the Colne Valley in Essex. The viaduct contains 4.5 million bricks.

In 1852 he applied for a patent, No. 14,096, for "Improvements in the construction of the permanent way of rail, tram, or other roads, and in the rolling stock or apparatus used therefor".

Colchester water supply
In 1851 Bruff, in partnership with William Hawkins, bought the Colchester Waterworks Company as an investment, as awareness of the relationship between water supply and public health increased. He sank an artesian well on the site of the old waterworks in 1852, which soon doubled the supply on the west side of Colchester, but in 1858 the east side, which had the densest population, still had no adequate supply. Two years later he discovered a good spring near Sheepen Farm and brought water from that to Balkerne Hill, but this remained insufficient. In 1880 the Colchester Corporation purchased the private waterworks and closed the Sheepen Farm source: the Jumbo Water Tower was constructed soon afterwards.

Walton-on-the-Naze
While working on the Ipswich line in 1855 Bruff bought a house, Burnt House Farm, in Walton-on-the-Naze, an already-established but unremarkable town on the Essex coast near Frinton. He began to work on developing Walton as a recognized seaside resort, and took a major step towards this end in 1867 when, having completed the Ipswich line, he built another railway line, to Walton. Peter Bruff's pier at Walton replaced an existing smaller pier which was blown down by a storm in 1881. Bruff was also responsible for the building of the Marine Terrace, South Terrace (destroyed by bombing in World War II) and Clifton Baths (today the Pier Hotel).

Clacton
Bruff is regarded by some as the Richard Branson of the 19th Century for the work he did in Clacton, which was virtually non-existent when he arrived. Upon his arrival in 1864, Bruff made a private deal to buy , the central part of the town, for around £10,000. The land concerned centred on the area each side of the Pier and back as far as Rosemary Lane. In about 1870 work began on the seaside resort of Clacton-on-Sea. In 1871 The Times declared, "That being an entirely new creation and not the adaptation of an existing town, none of the evils inseparable from the old watering holes will be allowed to exist in it. There will be no slums, nor any object that can offend the eye." When the pier opened, the town began truly to grow.

His later constructions in the town included the Royal Hotel in 1872, a public hall in Pier Avenue (which was destroyed by a fire in 1939) and the creation of the town centre. There is now a hospital ward and a residential road, both named in Bruff's memory.

Ipswich Sewerage Works
In 1880-1881 Bruff, as consulting engineer to the Ipswich Corporation, with his assistant and protege Thomas Miller junr., M.I.C.E., completely renovated the drainage of the town of Ipswich by the construction of a main sewer two and a half miles in length, intercepting the smaller sewers which had for many years emptied their out-flow into the river Orwell at various points. From this, the sewage was discharged into the tidal river at extensive outfall works built about one and a half miles from the town. Storage was provided for up to six million gallons of sewage and storm water, and was arranged so that the outlet was closed at high tide. The cost of the sewer and works was between £50,000 and £60,000. A grand ceremonial dinner was held in the outflow chamber immediately before it was brought into commission in 1881.

Coalport china works
Following the death of William Pugh in 1875, the Coalport china works of John Rose & Co., in Shropshire, were wound up, and the business was purchased by Peter Bruff in 1880. He re-established it as a limited liability company, the Coalport China Company, placing it under the management of his son Charles Clarke Bruff in 1889. After Peter Bruff's death in 1900 Charles became Director, bringing his nephew Arthur Bruff Garrett into the management, and he rebuilt the works on the original site in 1902. Under his vision and energy some of its former glory was revived. During the 1920s it fell again into financial difficulties and was eventually taken over by the Cauldon Potteries, Ltd., of Shelton, Staffordshire, in 1925.

Conclusion
Bruff died at Ipswich on 24 February 1900, and was buried in the old Municipal Cemetery in that town. His widow Harriette D. Bruff was buried there in 1907. His daughter Kate Garrett (who in 1860 married Newson Garrett (junior), son of Newson Garrett of Aldeburgh, and brother of Elizabeth Garrett Anderson and Millicent Garrett Fawcett) was buried in the same cemetery in 1924.

References

1812 births
1900 deaths
English civil engineers
British bridge engineers
British railway civil engineers
British railway pioneers
British railway entrepreneurs
Engineers from Portsmouth
Clacton-on-Sea
19th-century British businesspeople